Denso Ulysse (born 20 November 1998) is a Haitian footballer who plays as a defender.

Club career
Ulysse joined the Seattle Sounders FC Academy from Haitian side Real Hope Football Academy du Cap-Haïtien in March 2017. He was signed to reserve side Seattle Sounders FC 2 and made his debut on 25 April 2017 in a 3–2 home defeat to San Antonio FC, coming on as a 60th minute substitute for Henry Wingo.

Denso was signed by Major League Soccer expansion side Inter Miami CF on December 23, 2019. 

On September 9, 2021 Denso signed with the Richmond Kickers of USL League One.

Ulysse moved to new USL League One club Northern Colorado Hailstorm on 25 February 2022, ahead of their inaugural season. Following the 2022 season, Northern Colorado declined his contract option.

References

External links
 
 Denso Ulysse at Haiti Sports

1998 births
Living people
Association football defenders
Haitian footballers
Haitian expatriate footballers
Tacoma Defiance players
Ligue Haïtienne players
USL Championship players
People from Gonaïves
Expatriate soccer players in the United States
Haitian expatriate sportspeople in the United States
Inter Miami CF players
Richmond Kickers players
USL League One players
Northern Colorado Hailstorm FC players